Death Church is the first studio album by the anarcho-punk band Rudimentary Peni. It was released in 1983 on Corpus Christi Records. The recording and mixing took place at Southern Studios in April 1983 and was engineered by John Loder. "Rotten to the Core" is a direct verbal attack against John Lydon and Joe Strummer, accusing them of being hypocrites.

Track listing 
The vinyl release denotes tracks 1-11 as "The Corpus Christi Side", which then lists tracks 12-21 as "The Rudimental Human Side".
"¼ Dead"
"Blissful Myth"
"The Psycho Squat"
"Rotten to the Core"
"Poppycock"
"Cosmic Hearse"
"The Cloud Song"
"Vampire State Building"
"Blasphemy Squad"
"When You are a Martian Church"
"Pig in a Blanket"
"Inside"
"Nothing but a Nightmare"
"Flesh Crucifix"
"Slimy Member"
"Love is Not"
"Radio Schizo"
"Happy Farm"
"Alice Crucifies the Paedophiles"
"Army of Jesus"
"Dutchmen"

Personnel 
Jon (Greville)– drums
Nick (Blinko) – "mouth-guitar-pen" (guitar, vocals, cover artwork)
Grant (Brand)– "bass-writing" (bass guitar)

References

1983 debut albums
Concept albums
Rudimentary Peni albums